Apollo Road wharf is a ferry wharf located on the southern side of the Brisbane River serving the Brisbane suburb of Bulimba in Queensland, Australia. It is served by RiverCity Ferries' CityCat services.

History
The original wharf closed when Brisbane City Council ceased operating the cross river service to Bretts Wharf in December 1998 due to growing losses. It reopened on 4 February 2008 as the downstream terminus of the CityCat service.

The wharf sustained minor damage during the January 2011 Brisbane floods. It reopened after repairs on 14 February 2011.

Until October 2011, Apollo Road wharf was the downstream terminus for the CityCat service when it was extended to Northshore Hamilton.

References

External links

Bulimba, Queensland
Ferry wharves in Brisbane